Wernshausen is a part of Schmalkalden in the district Schmalkalden-Meiningen, in Thuringia, Germany. Until December 2008, when it was merged into Schmalkalden, it was an independent municipality.

Former municipalities in Thuringia
Schmalkalden-Meiningen